Lorik Ademi (born 30 July 2001) is a Swedish professional footballer who plays as a midfielder for Swedish club Falkenbergs FF.

Club career

Falkenbergs FF
On 17 January 2020, Ademi signed his first professional contract with Allsvenskan side Falkenbergs FF after agreeing to a one-year deal. On 7 March 2020, he made his debut with Falkenbergs FF in the group stage of 2019–20 Svenska Cupen against Norrköping after coming on as a substitute at 78th minute in place of Anton Wede.

International career
On 17 July 2020, Zgjim Sojeva, manager of Kosovo U21 said that Ademi, together with his teammate Edi Sylisufaj are in the process of adjusting the documentation and is expected to join the team during 2021.

Career statistics

Club

References

External links

2001 births
Living people
Swedish men's footballers
Swedish people of Kosovan descent
Swedish people of Albanian descent
Kosovan men's footballers
Kosovan expatriate sportspeople
Kosovan expatriate sportspeople in Sweden
Association football midfielders
Allsvenskan players
Falkenbergs FF players